Otis Verries Hicks, known as Lightnin' Slim (March 13, 1913 – July 27, 1974), was an American blues musician who played Louisiana blues and swamp blues for Excello Records. The blues critic ED Denson ranked him as one of the five great bluesmen of the 1950s, along with Muddy Waters, Little Walter, Howlin' Wolf and Sonny Boy Williamson.

Biography 
According to most sources, Otis Hicks was born on a farm outside St. Louis, Missouri, but the researchers Bob Eagle and Eric LeBlanc stated, on the basis of his draft card, that he was born in Good Pine, Louisiana. Prison records from Louisiana State Penitentiary discovered by researcher Gene Tomko also corroborate his birthplace as Good Pine, Louisiana.  He moved to Baton Rouge at the age of thirteen. Taught guitar by his older brother Layfield, Slim was playing in bars in Baton Rouge by the late 1940s.

His first recording was "Bad Luck Blues" ("If it wasn't for bad luck, I wouldn't have no luck at all"), released by J. D. "Jay" Miller's Feature Records in 1954. Miller gave him the stage name "Lightnin' Slim".  Slim then recorded for Excello Records for twelve years, starting in the mid-1950s, often collaborating with his brother-in-law Slim Harpo and with the harmonica player Lazy Lester.

Slim stopped performing the blues for a time and eventually worked in a foundry in Pontiac, Michigan, as a result of which his hands were constantly exposed to high temperatures. He was rediscovered by Fred Reif in 1970, in Pontiac, where he was living in a rented room at Slim Harpo's sister's house. Reif soon got him back performing again and a new recording contract with Excello, this time through Bud Howell, then the president of the company. His first engagement was a reunion concert in 1971 at the University of Chicago Folk Festival with Lazy Lester, whom Reif had brought from Baton Rouge in January of that year.

In the 1970s, Slim performed on tours in Europe, in the United Kingdom and at the Montreux Jazz Festival in Switzerland, for which he was often accompanied by Moses "Whispering" Smith on harmonica. He last toured the UK in 1973, with the American Blues Legends package organised by Big Bear Records.

In July 1974, Slim died of stomach cancer in Detroit, Michigan, aged 61.

Discography

Albums
Rooster Blues, Excello LPS-8000 (1960); CD release: Hip-O/MCA 40134, with three bonus tracks (1998)
Authentic R & B, three tracks, with various artists, UK Stateside SL-10068 (1963)
The Real R & B, two tracks, with various artists, UK Stateside SL-10112 (1964)
A Long Drink of Blues, six tracks (all of side 1), compilation album with Slim Harpo, UK Stateside SL-10135 (1964)
Lightnin' Slim's Bell Ringer, Excello LPS-8004 (1965); CD release: Ace Records #CDCHD-517 (1994)
The Real Blues, one track, with various artists, Excello LPS-8011 (1969)
High & Low Down, Excello LPS-8018 (1971) and Sonet SNTF-770 (1978); CD release: Ace Records #CDCHD-578 (1994)
That's All Right, Quicksilver QS-5062 (1983), reissue of Excello LPS-8018
London Gumbo, Excello LPS-8023 (1972) and Sonet SNTF-757 (1978)
The Excello Story, three tracks, with various artists, Excello LPS-8025 (1972), 2-LP set
Montreux Blues Festival, 10 tracks, with various artists, Excello LPS-8026 (1972), 2-LP set
American Blues Legends '73, 2 tracks with various artists, Big Bear Records BEAR20
The Early Years, Flyright FLYLP-524 (1976)
Trip to Chicago, Flyright FLYLP-533 (1978)
The Feature Sides 1954, Flyright FLYLP-583 (1981)
We Gotta Rock Tonight, Flyright FLYLP-612 (1986)

CD compilations
Rollin' Stone, Flyright FLYCD-08 (1989)
King of the Swamp Blues 1954–1961, Flyright FLYCD-47 (1992)
Blue Lightning, Indigo Records IGOCD-2002 (1992)
I'm Evil: Rare & Unissued Excello Masters, Volume One, Excello/AVI 3002 (1994)
It's Mighty Crazy!, Ace Records CDCHD-587 (1995)
Nothin' but the Devil, Ace Records CDCHD-616 (1996)
Winter Time Blues (The Later Excello Sessions 1962–1965), Ace Records CDCHD-674 (1998)
The Best of Lightnin' Slim, Hip-O/MCA 12010 (1999)
I'm a Rolling Stone: The Singles As & Bs 1954–1962 Centenary Edition, Jasmine JASMCD-3045 (2015), 2-CD set

Songs
"Farming Blues" (1954)
"New Orleans Bound" (1954)
"Bad Luck and Trouble" (1956)
"It's Mighty Crazy" (1957)
"G.I. Blues" (1959)
"My Starter Won't Start" (1958)

References

1913 births
1974 deaths
American blues singers
Musicians from St. Louis
Deaths from stomach cancer
Deaths from cancer in Michigan
Ace Records (United States) artists
Musicians from Baton Rouge, Louisiana
Louisiana blues musicians
Swamp blues musicians
African-American guitarists
Alive Naturalsound Records artists
American blues guitarists
American male guitarists
20th-century American guitarists
Singers from Louisiana
Singers from Missouri
Guitarists from Louisiana
Guitarists from Missouri
Excello Records artists
20th-century African-American male singers